Fond La Grange is a village near Borgne, Haiti. A hospital is located there. The hospital is run by the Alyans Sante Borgne, a partnership between the non-governmental organization H.O.P.E. (Haiti Outreach Pwoje Espwa, based in Rochester New York) and the Haitian government's ministry of public health (MSPP).

References

Populated places in Haiti